Boomhouwer is a Dutch surname. Notable people with the surname include:

 Jeffrey Boomhouwer (born 1988), Dutch handball player
 Sanne Boomhouwer (born 1984), singer better known as Susana (singer)

Surnames of Dutch origin